State Highway 10, commonly referred to as MH SH 10, is a normal state highway that runs south through Pune, Ahmednagar, Nashik and Dhule districts in the state of Maharashtra, India.  This state highway touches the cities of Dondaicha, Shevade, Mehergaon, Kusumbe, Malegaon, Manmad, Yeola, Kopargaon, Shirdi Rahata, Rahuri,  Ahmednagar, Kashti, and Daund.

Summary
In Nashik District this highway is known as "Malegaon-Manmad Road". Starting from Malegaon in Nashik district from its junction with National Highway 3, this highway terminates inside Manmad. Both sections of the highway run in a southward direction throughout their length. The highway runs a distance of XXX miles and traverses through Yeola, Nandgaon, Chandawad and Malegaon talukas. The surface of the road is asphalted and is motorable throughout the year.

In Ahmednagar District This highway is known as "Manmad-Daund Road". Starting from Manmad in Nasik district the road enters the northern boundary of Ahmednagar district and leaves for Daund in Pune district. This road serves as a connecting link between the three districts and runs almost parallel to the Daund-Manmad railway line. The road runs from the north to south direction and passes through the middle of the district.

This road crosses the Daund-Manmad broad-gauge railway line at numerous places during its course. It crosses river Godavari near Kopargaon, the Pravara near Kolhar, the Mula near Rahuri and the Bhima near the district border where there are bridges. It crosses a major nullah near Rahata where the construction of a bridge is in progress.

Some part of the road surface is cement-concrete and the remaining length of the road is black-topped. It serves the traffic needs of many sugar factories and jaggery manufacturers. This road passes through the factory area and therefore it is always crowded by bullock-carts and lorries. It is motorable throughout the year except for some interruptions at small nullahs during heavy rains.

Route description
Below is the brief summary of the route followed by this state highway.

Dhule District

Sindkheda Taluka
This highway starts from Dondaicha city in Sindkheda Taluka of Dhule District and proceeds South West towards Kusumbe. After travelling for another , it exits Sindkheda Taluka just before Lamkhani village and enters the Dhule taluka.

Dhule Taluka
Once this highway enters Dhule taluka, it travels for another  and enters Lamkhani village where State Highway 12 intersects this highway inside the village and this highway continues southwards. After traveling for another  this highway enters Mehergaon village where State Highway 14 starts off and proceeds south-east towards Dhule city while this highway proceeds south-west. Then this highways travels for another  where it intersects in to National Highway 53 at Kusumbe city. It then continues southwards for another  where it exits Dhule taluka just after Ajnale village and enters Malegaon Taluka of Nashik District.

Nashik District

Malegaon Taluka
This highway enters Malegaon taluka of Nashik district just before Dongrale village. After crossing Dongrale village, it continues for southwards another  where it enters Malegaon city. After traveling for another , near Kaulane village the State Highway 16 starts off and proceeds south-east towards Nandgaon while this highway proceeds south-west  for another  where it exits Malegaon taluka just after Chondhi village and enters Chandwad taluka.

Chandvad Taluka
This highway enters Chandwad taluka just before Kundalgaon village. After crossing Kundalgaon village it continues southwards for another  where it exits Chandwad taluka just after Dahegaon (Manmad) village and enters Nandgaon taluka.

Nandgaon Taluka
This highway enters Nandgaon taluka after travelling for  after Dahegaon (Manmad) village of Chandvad taluka. It enters Manmad city after traveling for another . Inside Manmad city after travelling for another  the State Highway 24 intersects this highway and merges on to it. Further State Highway 24 continues southwards with this highway for another , and then it branches west to proceed towards Chandvad city, while this highway continues south towards Anakwade village. After crossing Anakwade village it continues southwards for another  where it exits Nandgaon taluka and enters Yeola taluka.

Yeola Taluka
This highway enters Yeola taluka just after Anakwade village of Nandgaon taluka. After crossing Savargaon village it continues southwards for another  where it enters Yeola city. Inside Yeola city after this highway has travelled for another , the State Highway 30 intersects this highway from the west and merges on to it, while State Highway 25 starts at this point and continues northeast towards Nandgaon city. State Highway 30 continues southwards with this highway for another , and then it branches east to proceed towards Vaijapur city, while this highway continues southwards. After travelling for another  it exits Yeola Taluka just after Pimpalgaon Jalal village and enters Kopargaon Taluka of Ahmednagar District.

Ahmadnagar District

Kopargaon Taluka
This highway enters Kopargaon taluka of Ahmednagar district just before Yesgaon village. After crossing Yesgaon village, it continues southwards for another  where it enters Kopargaon city. After crossing Kopargaon city it continues southwards where it exits the taluka just before Sawali Vihir Bk. village and enters Rahata taluka.

Rahata Taluka
This highway enters Rahata taluka just before Sawali Vihir Bk. village. Just before Sawali Vihir Bk. village the State Highway 7 starts off at the junction of this highway and proceeds north west towards Lasalgaon in Nashik district., while this highway continues southwards for another  where it intersects State Highway 44 inside Babhaleshwar village. Then this highway continues southwards for another  where State Highway 45 starts off at the junction of this highway inside Kolhar Bk. village and proceeds north west towards Sinnar in Nashik district. Then this highway continues southwards for another  where it exits Rahata taluka just after crossing Pravara river near Kolhar Bk. village and enters Rahuri taluka.

Rahuri Taluka
This highway enters Rahuri taluka after crossing Pravara river and just before Kolhar Kh. village. After continuing southwards for another , State Highway 49 branches off at the junction of this highway inside Rahuri city and proceeds south west towards Sangamner in Ahmadnagar district while this highway continues southwards.

Ahmadnagar Taluka
This highway enters Ahmadnagar taluka just before Nandgaon village

Shrigonda Taluka

Pune District

Daund Taluka

Major junctions

The following roads either emanate from it or are crossed by it. This list has been separated by district and taluka for easy reading.

Connections 
This highway touches the following important places in its stretch. The list has been separated by district and taluka for easy reading. In each table, the distance of the place from important places in the route of this highway are also mentioned.

Dhule District

Nashik District

Ahmadnagar District

Pune District

See also
 List of State Highways in Maharashtra

References

State Highways in Maharashtra